Henri Rabaute (26 May 1943 – 11 October 2000) was a French racing cyclist. He rode in the 1970 Tour de France.

References

External links
 

1943 births
2000 deaths
French male cyclists
Place of birth missing